In mathematics, a fusion category is a category that is rigid, semisimple, -linear, monoidal and has only finitely many isomorphism classes of simple objects, such that the monoidal unit is simple.

Examples

 Representation Category of a finite group

Reconstruction

Under Tannaka–Krein duality, every fusion category arises as the representations of a weak Hopf algebra.

References

Category theory